Captain Cat is a 2012 children's picture book by Inga Moore. It is about a sea captain, Captain Cat, who trades goods in exchange for cats, and his ensuing adventures.

Publication history
2013, USA, Candlewick Press 
2012, England, Walker Books

Reception
Kirkus Reviews wrote "Though it’s on the long side, Moore’s tale combines traditional themes and spritely illustrations to create a satisfying, offbeat adventure." A reviewer stated in The Bulletin of the Center for Children's Books "This would be a cozy classroom readaloud selection or a comfy bedtime story; having a couple of kitties on hand would, of course, enrich the experience.",

Captain Cat has also been reviewed by BookPage, Magpies, The New York Foundling, The Guardian, The New York Times, Publishers Weekly, The Oklahoman The Morning Call, Booklist, School Library Journal, and Horn Book Guides.

References

External links

Library holdings of Captain Cat

2012 children's books
British picture books
Children's fiction books
Books about cats
Nautical fiction
Walker Books books